Anton Scudier Central Park, formerly known as Stalin Park and Scudier Park, is an urban park in Timișoara. It was founded in 1870 by General Anton von Scudier and carried his name until the partition of Banat in 1919.

History 
Between 1738 and 1771 there was a cemetery on the site of the current Central Park, where about 8,000–9,000 people were buried, most of them dead during the plague epidemic of 1738–1739. After the arrangement of the cemetery in Calea Lipovei, the one on the site of the current park was closed, and in the 60s and 70s of the 19th century, General Anton von Scudier, as military commander of Banat, decided to transform the old civil and military cemetery into an English landscape park. The remains of those buried here were exhumed by soldiers and, after a religious service, were reburied in the cemetery in Calea Lipovei.

The swampy and insalubrious land was drained and leveled, and in 1879 the Park Association, founded by the inhabitants of Iosefin and Elisabetin, planted trees and took care of its arrangement, initially in English style, with large lawns and alleys that intersected in the middle of the park. The park, which occupies an area of over nine hectares, was taken over by the town hall in 1905 to be cared for; during this period decorative species such as yews, chestnuts, pines, walnuts or hickories were planted here. In the middle of the Scudier Park was a music pavilion. In 1912, a World Diorama (Weltdiorama) was installed here. In 1903, a pavilion was built for the presentation and sale of furniture. Between the two world wars, exhibitions of painters from Timișoara were organized in this pavilion. Until 1932, the railway line that connected Timișoara with Baziaș passed through the middle of the park.

From the early 1950s until 1955 the park was called Stalin Park, then Central Park. It received its current name in 2015. Between 2017 and 2019, the park was redesigned in Viennese style, reminiscent of the Schönbrunn Gardens.

Monuments

Statue of Anton von Scudier 

In 1881, a life-size gilded cast iron statue of General Scudier was placed in the park. The statue was destroyed on 26 October 1918, during the unrest caused by the dissolution of Austria-Hungary; later, a clock was installed on its pedestal.

Monument of the Romanian Soldier 

Today, on the site of the former Scudier's statue, the Monument of the Romanian Soldier is placed. Sculpted by Ion Vlad from Rușchița marble, the monument was unveiled on 30 December 1962 and was originally dedicated to the "liberating Soviet soldier". In 2013, a local PNȚCD councilor proposed the removal of the monument from the park to the Heroes' Cemetery in Calea Lipovei, which also houses the graves of Russian soldiers who died in World War II. The proposal was criticized by the Union of Fine Artists of Timișoara, in whose opinion the monument is an important work of artistic value.

Alley of Personalities 
Established in 2009, the Alley of Personalities is an open-air museum, where 26 bronze busts of some prominent local personalities are exhibited. The busts are placed clockwise, with Sever Bocu's bust near the entrance from the cathedral:

References 

Parks in Timișoara